The Sun Bowl is a college football bowl game that has been played since 1935 in the southwestern United States at El Paso, Texas. Along with the Sugar Bowl and Orange Bowl, it is the second-oldest bowl game in the country, behind the Rose Bowl. Usually held near the end of December, games are played at the Sun Bowl stadium on the campus of the University of Texas at El Paso. Since 2011, it has featured teams from the Atlantic Coast Conference (ACC) and the Pac-12 Conference.

Since 2019, the game has been sponsored by Kellogg's and is officially known as the Tony the Tiger Sun Bowl, after the mascot for the company's Frosted Flakes cereal. Previous sponsors include John Hancock Financial, Norwest Corporation, Wells Fargo, Helen of Troy Limited (using its Vitalis and Brut brands) and Hyundai Motor Company.

History
The first Sun Bowl was the 1935 edition, played on New Year's Day between Texas high school teams; the 1936 edition, played one year later, was the first Sun Bowl contested between college teams. In most of its early history, the game pitted the champion of the Border Conference against an at-large opponent. The first three editions were played at El Paso High School stadium (1935–1937), then switched to Kidd Field until the present stadium was ready in 1963. Through the 1957 season, the game was played on January 1 or January 2; since then, with the exception of the 1976 season, the game has been played in late December, with a majority of games played on or near New Year's Eve and on several occasions played on or after Christmas Day (1982, 1986 & 1987 on Christmas Day) as well as on or before Christmas Eve  .

Notable games
The 1940 game set the record for fewest points scored, when the Arizona State Teachers College at Tempe Bulldogs played the Catholic University Cardinals to a scoreless tie, the only 0–0 result in Sun Bowl history.

In advance of the 1949 game, Lafayette College turned down an invitation from the Sun Bowl Committee because the committee would not allow an African American player to participate. This bid rejection led to a large student demonstration on the Lafayette campus and in the city of Easton, Pennsylvania, against segregation.

Due to a freak snowstorm before the 1974 game, followed by warming temperatures as the sun created a rising steam from the field during the first half, the game was nicknamed the "Fog Bowl."

The 1992 game was the final head coaching appearance of 2001 College Football Hall of Fame inductee Grant Teaff of Baylor; his Bears won  over Arizona.

The 1994 game was voted the greatest Sun Bowl ever played, and included four touchdowns by Priest Holmes, as Texas defeated North Carolina, 35–31.

The 2005 game set the record for most points scored (88), as UCLA defeated Northwestern, 50–38.

The 2011 game is the only Sun Bowl decided in overtime (the NCAA started the use of overtime in Division I bowl games in 1995); Utah defeated Georgia Tech, 30–27.

The 2020 edition of the bowl was canceled due to the COVID-19 pandemic.

On December 26, 2021, the Miami Hurricanes announced they would not be able to play in the 2021 edition due to COVID-19 issues so organizers stated they would try to secure a replacement team to face the Washington State Cougars. The following day, the Central Michigan Chippewas were named as the Sun Bowl replacement team. The Chippewas had originally been scheduled to face the Boise State Broncos in the Arizona Bowl, until Boise State withdrew from that bowl due to COVID-19 issues.

Sponsorship
The bowl's first title sponsor was John Hancock Financial, who entered a three-year, $1.5 million partnership in June 1986. This came at a time that corporate sponsorship was not common for bowl games, and followed the Fiesta Bowl entering a sponsorship agreement that had made its January 1986 edition the Sunkist Fiesta Bowl. In March 1989, with Sun Bowl organizers and John Hancock Financial negotiating a renewal of the sponsorship agreement, it was reported that an extension might involve renaming the bowl. That came to pass in June 1989, with the annual game changing its name to John Hancock Bowl. Cited as the reason for the change was that, under the prior agreement, the sponsor's name "wasn't mentioned enough in national media to justify the expense." Even after the formal name change, some newspapers continued to refer to it as the Sun Bowl. Five editions of the game were staged as the John Hancock Bowl, from 1989 through 1993. After the 1993 playing, John Hancock Financial reduced its support of the bowl game, to dedicate more of its promotional budget to the 1996 Summer Olympics. The name reverted to Sun Bowl, and to ensure the game would continue, the El Paso city council allocated $600,000 to cover expenses in case of a shortfall.

Subsequent title sponsorship came from Norwest Corporation (1996–1998), which then merged into Wells Fargo (1999–2003), El Paso-based Helen of Troy Limited—using its brand names of Vitalis (2004–2005) and Brut (2006–2009)—and Hyundai Motor Company (2010–2018). In August 2019, it was announced that Kellogg's had been named the new title sponsor, and that the game would be branded as the Tony the Tiger Sun Bowl—referencing Tony the Tiger, the mascot of the company's cereal brand Frosted Flakes.

Conference tie-ins
Starting with the 2011 edition, the bowl has been contested between teams from the Pac-12 Conference and Atlantic Coast Conference (ACC).

The Sun Bowl is part of the ACC's pool arrangement where the Duke's Mayo (formerly Belk), Pinstripe, Music City, and Gator bowls each share choice of the conference's eligible teams following the College Football Playoff (CFP) and the Cheez-It Bowl (formerly the Camping World Bowl). The Sun Bowl can take any team ranked fourth through eighth in the ACC.

The Pac-12 currently employs the Sun Bowl as its fifth choice, behind the CFP and the Alamo, Holiday, and Redbox bowls.

Game results
Three editions of the bowl ended in a tie—1936, 1940, and 1985—they are denoted by italics in the below table; overtime has been used in bowl games since the 1995–96 bowl season. The inaugural game in 1935 was contested between high school teams. For sponsorship reasons, the 1989 through 1993 editions were known as the John Hancock Bowl. 

Rankings are based on the AP Poll, prior to game being played.

Source:

Awards

C.M. Hendricks Most Valuable Player Trophy
Awarded since 1950; named after the first Sun Bowl Association president, Dr. C. M. Hendricks.
Two players have been two-time MVPs; Charley Johnson (1959, 1960) and Billy Stevens (1965, 1967).

Source:

Jimmy Rogers Jr. Most Valuable Lineman Trophy
Awarded since 1961; named after former Sun Bowl president Jimmy Rogers Jr.

Source:

John Folmer Most Valuable Special Teams Player Trophy
Awarded since 1994; named after former Sun Bowl president John Folmer.Positions: P=Punter, K=Kicker, PR=Punt returner, KR=Kickoff returner

Most appearances
Updated through the December 2022 edition (88 games, 176 total appearances).

Teams with multiple appearances

Teams with a single appearance
Won (13): Baylor, Central Michigan, George Washington, Louisville, Miami (Ohio), NC State, Notre Dame, Oklahoma State, Second Air Force, Tulsa, Villanova, Western Reserve, Wisconsin

Lost (19): Army, Denver, Drake, Duke, Florida, Georgetown, Houston, Illinois, Iowa State, Kansas, North Texas State, Northwestern, Ohio, Ole Miss, South Florida, Tennessee, UNAM, Utah State, Wichita

Tied (1): Catholic

Notes
 UTEP's record includes appearances when it was known as Texas Mines and Texas Western.
 New Mexico State's record includes appearances when it was known as New Mexico A&M.
 California and Colorado are the only current Pac-12 members that have not appeared in the Sun Bowl.
 Northern Arizona (now in the FCS) is the only former member of the Border Conference that has not appeared in the Sun Bowl.

Appearances by conference
Updated through the December 2022 edition (88 games, 176 total appearances).

 Games marked with an asterisk (*) were played in January of the following calendar year.
 The first edition of the game, played in January 1935, was contested between high school teams.
 Records are based on teams' conferences at the time each game was played.
 Conferences that are defunct or not currently active in FBS are marked in italics.
 The American Athletic Conference (The American), retains the conference charter of the Big East following the 2013 split of the original Big East along football lines. Big East appearances: South Florida (2007) and Pittsburgh (2008).
 The Pac-12's record includes appearances by teams when the conference was the Pac-8 and Pac-10.
 The Mountain States Conferences was popularly known as the Skyline Conference from 1947 through 1962.
 Independent appearances (30): Army (1988), Catholic (1939*), Cincinnati (1946*), Drake (1957*), Florida State (1954*, 1966), Georgetown (1949*), Georgia Tech (1970), Hardin–Simmons (1935*, 1936*), Louisville (1957*), Mexico (1944*), Miami (OH) (1947*), New Mexico (1943*), Notre Dame (2010), Oregon (1963), Pacific (1951*, 1952*), Pittsburgh (1975, 1989), Second Air Force (1942*), Southern Miss (1952*, 1953*), UTEP (1965, 1967), Villanova (1961), West Texas State (1962), and West Virginia (1937*, 1948*, 1987).

Game records

Source:

Media coverage

NBC broadcast the Sun Bowl nationally in 1964 and 1966. From 1968 until the present, the game has been broadcast by CBS Sports. The Sun Bowl's contract with CBS Sports is the longest continuous relationship between a bowl game and one TV network.

References

External links
 

 
College football bowls
Recurring sporting events established in 1935
1935 establishments in Texas